East 79th (signed as East 79th Street) is a station on the RTA Blue and Green Lines in Cleveland, Ohio. It is located on East 79th Street south of Holton Avenue.

History
The station opened on April 11, 1920 when service commenced on the line west of Shaker Square to East 34th Street and via surface streets to downtown.

The worst accident in the history of the RTA Rapid Transit occurred just east of the station. On July 8, 1977, two cars collided head-on during single track operation. The accident occurred at the bridge over East 92nd Street. Both operators and 60 passengers were injured, and both cars were a total loss.

In 1980 and 1981, the trunk line of the Green and Blue Lines from East 55th Street to Shaker Square was completely renovated with new track, ballast, poles and wiring, and new stations were built along the line. The renovated line opened on October 30, 1981.

Station layout

References

Blue Line (RTA Rapid Transit)
Green Line (RTA Rapid Transit)
Railway stations in the United States opened in 1920
1920 establishments in Ohio